Appuntamento a Ischia is a 1960 Italian "musicarello" comedy film directed by Mario Mattoli and starring Domenico Modugno.

Cast
 Domenico Modugno as Mimmo
 Antonella Lualdi as Mirella Argente
 Maria Letizia Gazzoni as Letizia
 Carlo Croccolo as Carlette
 Paolo Ferrari: Paolo
 Mina: as herself
 Elsa Vazzoler: Anna
 Pietro De Vico: pianista
 Ugo D'Alessio: Antonio
 Linda Christian as Mercedes
 Yvette Masson as Veronique
 Franco Franchi as smuggler
 Ciccio Ingrassia as smuggler
 Pippo Franco as guitarist of Mina
 Franco Califano as Mimmo double bass player
 Alberto Talegalli as Direttore dello zoo
 Mario Castellani as Agente musicale
 Carlo Taranto as Gennarino
 Toni Ucci as man sitting at the bar table
  as Maresciallo della Finanza (as Mimmo Billi)

References

External links

1960 films
1960 musical comedy films
1960s Italian-language films
Films directed by Mario Mattoli
Musicarelli
1960s Italian films